The Edge O' Beyond is a 1908 novel by the British writer Gertrude Page. Like a number of her works it is set in Rhodesia where she had settled. It was translated into both Czech and Polish.

Adaptations
The novel was adapted by Page into a West End play. This was subsequently adapted into a 1919 British silent film Edge O' Beyond starring Ruby Miller who had also appeared in the play.

References

Bibliography
 Bamford, Kenton. Distorted images: British national identity and film in the 1920s. I.B. Tauris, 1999.
 Free, Melissa. Beyond Gold and Diamonds: Genre, the Authorial Informant, and the British South African Novel. SUNY Press, 2021.
 Goble, Alan. The Complete Index to Literary Sources in Film. Walter de Gruyter, 1999.

1908 British novels
Novels by Gertrude Page
British romance novels
British novels adapted into films
Novels set in Rhodesia
Hurst and Blackett books